Marcus Gross (born 28 September 1989) is a German canoeist who has competed since the late 2000s.

He won a bronze medal in the K-2 500 m event at the 2009 ICF Canoe Sprint World Championships in Dartmouth. At the 2012 Summer Olympics, he competed in the Men's K-4 1000 metres, finishing in 4th place with the team in the final.  Gross teamed up with Max Rendschmidt to win the K-2 1000m at the 2013 World Championships and the 2013 European Championships. They defended their European title in 2014. In June 2015, he competed in the inaugural European Games, for Germany in canoe sprint, more specifically, Men's K-2 1000m with Max Rendschmidt.  He earned a silver medal.  The team also won the K2 500 m at the 2015 European Championships.  At the 2015 World Championships, Gross and Rendschmidt won the men's K-2 1000m.  Gross marked the occasion by proposing to his girlfriend.

He represented his country also at the 2016 Summer Olympics and won two gold medals, in K-2 1000 metres and K-4 1000 m events.  In the K-2 1000 metres he competed with Max Rendschmidt, while the K-4 team consisted of Gross, Rendschmidt, Tom Liebscher and Max Hoff.  That year Gross and Hoff also won the European K2 1000 m event.  In 2017, they retained the European title.

Having missed out on the title at the 2017 World Championships, Gross and Hoff won the K2 1000 m at the 2018 World Championships.  At the 2018 European Championships, Gross and Hoff won a silver medal in the K2 1000 m.

References

External links

1989 births
German male canoeists
Living people
ICF Canoe Sprint World Championships medalists in kayak
Olympic canoeists of Germany
Canoeists at the 2012 Summer Olympics
Canoeists at the 2016 Summer Olympics
European Games medalists in canoeing
Canoeists at the 2015 European Games
European Games silver medalists for Germany
Olympic gold medalists for Germany
Olympic medalists in canoeing
Medalists at the 2016 Summer Olympics
People from Görlitz
Sportspeople from Saxony